Quantico ( or ; formerly Potomac) is a town in Prince William County, Virginia, United States.  The population was 480 at the 2010 census. Quantico is approximately 35 miles southwest of Washington, DC, bordered by the Potomac River to the east and the Quantico Creek to the north. The word Quantico is a corruption of the name of a Doeg village recorded by English colonists as Pamacocack.

Quantico is surrounded on its remaining two sides by one of the largest U.S. Marine Corps bases, Marine Corps Base Quantico. The base is the site of the HMX-1 presidential helicopter squadron, the FBI Academy, the FBI Laboratory, the Marine Corps Combat Development Command, the Officer Candidates School, The Basic School, The United States Drug Enforcement Administration training academy, the Naval Criminal Investigative Service, the United States Army Criminal Investigation Division, and the Air Force Office of Special Investigations headquarters. A replica of the United States Marine Corps War Memorial stands at one of the entrances to the base.

Geography 

Climate
Quantico has a humid subtropical climate (Köppen climate classification Cfa).

Demographics 

As of the census of 2000, there were 561 people, 295 households, and 107 families living in the town. The racial makeup was 61.32% White, 20.32% African American, 10.16% Asian, 0.36% Native American, 2.32% from other races, and 5.53% from two or more races. Hispanic or Latino of any race were 5.53% of the population. The median income for a household in the town was $26,250. About 22.4% of families and 21.4% of the population were below the poverty line, including 39.4% of those under the age of 18.

Popular culture
The headquarters of the FBI Academy at the Quantico Marine Corps Base are featured in the 1991 film The Silence of the Lambs, the 2013–2015 TV series Hannibal, and the 2015–2018 series Quantico. The headquarters of the FBI Behavioral Analysis Unit are also featured in the 2005–2020 series Criminal Minds and the 2017–2019 series Mindhunter.

Transportation
There are no significant highways passing through Quantico. All road vehicles must pass through Marine Corps Base Quantico in order to reach the town. Therefore, all vehicle drivers must present a valid driver's license to the military security officer stationed at the gate, and may be required to state their destination and reason for visiting. More thorough searches and checks may also be undertaken, according to the discretion and authority of base security.

Amtrak's Northeast Regional and Piedmont services, as well as the local Virginia Railway Express, all stop at Quantico station.

Stafford Regional Airport is the closest non-military airport, though the airfield exclusively serves general aviation and has no regularly scheduled commercial flights. Airports serving Washington, D.C. are the primary commercial air links for Quantico, with the closest being Reagan National Airport and the primary hub for international flights being Dulles International Airport.

Notable people
 Robert L. Crawford Jr., actor on Laramie
 Geof Isherwood, artist
 Shelby Lynne, musician, singer, songwriter, producer, owner of Everso Records, actress
 Roy Thomas, former pitcher for the Seattle Mariners

See also

 Langley, Virginia
 Behavioral Analysis Unit
 Hostage Rescue Team
 Marine Corps Base Quantico
 Quantico station
 Quantico National Cemetery

References

External links 

 Town of Quantico  (Town has not paid for renewal, link is not working)
 Prince William County Government
 Potomac District Supervisor
 FBI

 
Virginia populated places on the Potomac River
Towns in Prince William County, Virginia